Weightlifting at the 2014 Asian Games was held in Incheon, South Korea from September 20 to 26, 2014. There were seven weight categories for the women and eight for the men. All competition took place at the Moonlight Festival Garden Weightlifting Venue.

Schedule

Medalists

Men

Women

Medal table

Participating nations
A total of 200 athletes from 32 nations competed in weightlifting at the 2014 Asian Games:

References

Results

External links
 Schedule and result

 
2014 Asian Games events
2014
Asian Games
International weightlifting competitions hosted by South Korea